Karim Ali Fathy (born May 30, 1993) is a professional squash player who represents Egypt.

Career
Fathy won the prestigious British Junior Open Under-13 category in 2007 and one year later he won the Under-15 category by defeating Nasir Iqbal. He stood at World No. 340 in March 2009.
As of October 2013, Fathy reached a  world ranking of World No. 39 after taking the Madison Open of the US state of Wisconsin, beating Englishman Joel Hinds 3-2.

References

External links
  (archive 3)
 

1993 births
Living people
Egyptian male squash players
21st-century Egyptian people